The Sporck Battalion (German: Die sporck'schen Jäger) is a 1934 German drama film directed by Rolf Randolf and Theodor Loos and starring Fritz Genschow, Werner Schott and Erich Fiedler. It is based on a novel of the same name which had previously been made into the 1927 silent film The Sporck Battalion.

It was shot at the Bavaria Studios in Munich and on location around the Masuren Lakes in East Prussia. The film's sets were designed by the art director Heinrich Richter.

Cast
 Fritz Genschow as Leutnant v. Naugaard 
 Werner Schott as Hauptmann Rabenhainer 
 Erich Fiedler as Oberleutnant v. Vahlenberg 
 Theodor Loos as Oberförster Rüdiger 
 Reva Holsey as Elsbeth, seine Tochter 
 Fritz Alberti as Oberstleutnant 
 Paul Rehkopf as Vater Retelsdorf, Fischermeister 
 Margarete Kupfer as Seine Frau 
 Rotraut Richter as Mike, beider Tochter 
 Paul Westermeier as Heinrich Kremzow, Fischergeselle 
 Erik Ode
 Ida Perry
 Antonie Jaeckel 
 Frank Günther
 Michael von Newlinsky
 Max Wilmsen
 Franz Klebusch

References

Bibliography 
 Waldman, Harry. Nazi Films in America, 1933-1942. McFarland, 2008.

External links 
 

1934 films
1934 drama films
German drama films
Films of Nazi Germany
1930s German-language films
Films directed by Rolf Randolf
Bavaria Film films
Films shot at Bavaria Studios
Films based on German novels
German black-and-white films
Remakes of German films
Films set in Prussia
1930s German films